Jordan Galland (born 1980) is an American filmmaker and musician based in New York City, and operates Slush Puppy Music, a record label, as well as his own film production company, Ravenous Films.

Early life
Born in Farmington, Connecticut, Galland was raised in New York City and graduated in 2002 from New York University, where he studied film, animation and mythology.

Music career
At eighteen, Galland formed the rock band Dopo Yume. Dopo Yume also played shows with musical group Phantom Planet, both contributed musical selections to the popular show The O.C. California, and Dopo Yume's contribution The Secret Show (The Day After Tomorrow).

A later band, Domino, is signed to Mark Ronson's Allido Records label. Additionally, Galland has collaborated with his childhood friend, Sean Lennon, played electric piano on Mark Ronson's album Version and co-wrote tracks on Daniel Merriweather's 2010 Love & War, also released on Allido Records.

In 2006, Jordan Galland began working on a series of solo material with friends and former band-mates David Muller (formerly of the Fiery Furnaces) and Sam Oates for what would ultimately become his solo-debut, "Airbrush." In 2008, Galland and Muller continued to build on the solo-material and co-produced Jordan Galland's sophomore solo release, "Search Party." The album was recorded in Hampton Bays, New York, and mixed by Ron Shaffer at Atlantic West Studios in Brooklyn.

Galland collaborated with Mark Ronson on a video homage to The Legend of Zelda.
Galland provided the music for director Sara Ziffs award-winning film Picture Me. She had appeared in an earlier music video of Gallands' "The Princess Waits"
In 2011, Galland released an EP via his record label Slush Puppy Music, titled To The Top.  The music video for the EP's title track appeared on Glamour.com and AOL's music website, Spinner.com as the Music Video of the Day on May 31, 2011.

Galland did a cover version of "birthday cake" by Cibo Matto

Film career
Galland has contributed to a wide spectrum of movies, ranging from romantic comedy to the genre of Horror film, and Zombie comedy.

Galland's 2005 short film, Smile for the Camera, received an award for best screencraft at the New York Independent International Film and Video Festival in 2005. Galland directed, photographed, and edited the film himself, and wrote the film's theme song and musical score with Sean Lennon and Timo Ellis.
An animated music video for his band Domino, Green Umbrella, was shown at multiple film festivals in the U.S., and in Madrid at Alcine37.

Galland has been working on a screen adaptation of Ryu Murakami's Coin Locker Babies, since 1998, in collaboration with Michele Civetta, Peter Kline, and Sean Lennon.

Galland's feature-length debut, Rosencrantz and Guildenstern Are Undead, a vampire film he wrote and directed, was filmed in New York City in December 2007 and stars Ralph Macchio, Jeremy Sisto, and Jake Hoffman. A 2009 Halloween launch party was held at Wooleys in New York. The movie is set to be released in June 2010 through Indican Pictures. This movie is currently playing on Showtime (TV network)

Alter Egos, a movie about super heroes written and directed by Galland, was released in November 2012. It stars Kris Lemche and Danny Masterson, and again involves a collaboration with Sean Lennon, who both stars (as "Electric Death") and contributes the music.

Galland had music contributions in two entries in Tribeca Film Festival 2012; the movie Supporting Characters and also Krysten Ritter's movie, L!fe Happens.

Jordan contributed a song, "Hearts on Ice," to the film Life of Crime.

Filmography

Discography

Solo discography
 Airbrush (2009)
 Search Party (2010)
 To the Top (2011)
 Wind-up Rabbit (2013)

With Dopo Yume
 Yumania (2001)
 In the Bedroom (2002)
 True Romance (2003) (with guitar and piano by Sean Lennon, and backing vocals by Bijou Phillips)
 The Secret Show (2006)

Other

Animation
 Galland has done all the animation work in his movies, having studied animation at New York University.  In addition he contributed animation (the welcoming birds) in the promotional posters for Plastic Ono Band.
 Galland recently did the animation for the Jewellery ad campaign "you're my Boo" for Waris Ahluwalia's House of Waris.

Philanthropy
 Galland's band Dopo Yume contributed a song to a cd:Mystique, "a Benefit for the AIDS Action."
 Galland's other band Domino had a listing on Mark Ronson Presents Hard Rock, which was distributed exclusively through the Hard Rock Cafe where a portion of the proceeds go to the non-profit organization: Play Pumps (Roundabout PlayPump), that helps to provide clean drinking water to third world countries.
 Galland has contributed music to countless Charity Art shows, including shows that benefit the Nest Foundation, which aids abused children in New York.

Awards and nominations
 Green Umbrella — Best Musical Form, 2006 Da Vinci Film and Video Festival
 Green Umbrella — Best Animated Short, 2006 Black Earth Film Festival
 Green Umbrella — Music Video Award (animation), second place, 2006 Indie Gathering
 Smile for the Camera — ScreenCraft Award (short film), 2005 New York International Independent Film and Video Festival
 Rozencrantz and Guildenstern are Undead – Comedy Award at DC Independent Film Festival,
 2010 L.A. Comedy Shorts Film Festival Movie Magic Screenwriter Screenplay Competition Semi-finalists: Commercial Affairs
 2012 Best Narrative feature at Hells Half Mile Festival for Alter Egos

References

External links
 
 

1980 births
Living people
American male composers
21st-century American composers
New York University alumni
Dalton School alumni
Date of birth missing (living people)
Singer-songwriters from New York (state)
Film directors from New York City
21st-century American male singers
21st-century American singers
American male singer-songwriters
Singer-songwriters from Connecticut